The Mission River is a river located in Far North Queensland, Australia.

The river is formed by the confluence of Myall Creek and another minor creek. The river flows in a westerly direction an eventually discharges into Albatross Bay near Oxmurra Point and the town of Weipa. The waters then flow into the Gulf of Carpentaria. The river descends  over its  course.

See also
Mission River (locality), Queensland

References

Rivers of Far North Queensland